Ashby, Virginia is a region located in Cumberland County, Virginia. Ashby is widely known for its various paranormal incidents during the 19 century. Many of the incidents are poorly reported, however recently discovered photographs have confirmed a number of these incidents. 
thumb
Ashby, Cumberland County, Virginia
Ashby, Warren County, Virginia